Scolopendra crassa is a species of centipede in the family Scolopendridae. It is endemic to Sri Lanka. The last taxonomic scrutiny was done in 1930 by Attems.

Taxon Identification:

ITIS Taxon Serial Number: 1091050

GBIF Taxon ID: :5179621

EOL ID: 309635

References

crassa
Endemic fauna of Sri Lanka
Arthropods of Sri Lanka
Animals described in 1846
Taxa named by Robert Templeton